The 2001–02 Mestis season was the second season of the Mestis, the second level of ice hockey in Finland. 12 teams participated in the league, and Jukurit won the championship.

Standings

Playoffs

Qualification

Diskos got relegated to Suomi-sarja.

External links
 Season on hockeyarchives.info

Fin
2001–02 in Finnish ice hockey
Mestis seasons